Lisa Raymond and Rennae Stubbs were the defending champions and successfully defended their title, defeating Alexandra Fusai and Caroline Vis 6–4, 3–6, 7–6(7–4) in the final. It was the 33rd title for Raymond and the 37th title for Stubbs in their respective careers. It was also the 6th title for the pair in the year.

Seeds
The first four seeds received a bye into the second round.

Draw

Finals

Top half

Bottom half

External links
 Main and Qualifying draws

Family Circle Cup
Charleston Open